The 2002–03 Ohio State Buckeyes men's basketball finished 8th in the Big Ten regular season standing but made it the championship game of the Big Ten tournament for the second consecutive time. The Buckeyes went to the NIT where they lost to Georgia Tech in the first round.

Roster

Starting lineup

References

Ohio State
Ohio State Buckeyes men's basketball seasons
Ohio State
Ohio State Buckeyes
Ohio State Buckeyes